Duncan Sprott is a novelist living in Ireland.

Life 
He attended the University of St Andrews where he read Theology, and was awarded the G. W. Anderson Prize for Hebrew. He then attended the Heatherley School of Fine Art and ended up teaching English, Greek and Drama for 13 years. He has been a full-time writer since 1990, his novels having been translated into many languages and which are mostly set within a historical backdrop. He was awarded an Arts Council Literature Bursary in 1995 and his journalism has appeared in most of the major national newspapers. He currently resides in Ireland.

Writing

Novels

Independent novels 
The Clopton Hercules (1991)
The Rise of Mr. Warde (1992)
Our Lady of the Potatoes (1995)

Ptolemies Quartet (ongoing) 
The House of the Eagle (2004)
Daughter of the Crocodile (2006)

Nonfiction 
1784 (1984)
Sprottichronicon: A Millennium Cracker (2000)

References

External links 
Duncan Sprott
Rereadings: Duncan Sprott on CP Cavafy
Review: The House of the Eagle by Duncan Sprott

Irish male novelists
Irish historical novelists
20th-century Irish non-fiction writers
21st-century Irish non-fiction writers
Living people
Year of birth missing (living people)